is a railway station located in the city of Izunokuni, Shizuoka Prefecture, Japan operated by the private railroad company Izuhakone Railway.

Lines
Ōhito Station is served by the Sunzu Line, and is located 16.6 kilometers from the starting point of the line at Mishima Station.

Station layout
The station  has an island platform and a side platform connected to the station building by a level crossing. The station building has both a staffed service counter and automatic ticket machines.

Platforms

History 
Ōhito Station was opened on July 17, 1899 as part of the extension of the Sunzu line from Nanjō Station (present-day Izu-Nagaoka. The line was further extended to its present terminus at Shuzenji in 1924.

Passenger statistics
In fiscal 2017, the station was used by an average of 1255 passengers daily (boarding passengers only).

Surrounding area
 Ōhito onsen
 Ōhito High School

See also
 List of Railway Stations in Japan

References

External links

 Official home page

Railway stations in Japan opened in 1899
Railway stations in Shizuoka Prefecture
Izuhakone Sunzu Line
Izunokuni